Art-Club was an association of artists during the postwar period in Vienna, Austria, in 1946–1959.

History
Art-Club was formed with the intention of fighting for the autonomy of modern art. This rather late standpoint in art history should be viewed in the light of the conditions dictated by Nazi art ideals right after Anschluss. The autonomy of the arts had been soiled by the concept of entartete Kunst and needed to be emphasized. For a decade marked by violence, the free picture had been oppressed as well as the free word.

Some groups
Unlike Gruppe 47 in Germany, the Austrian Art-Club was not specially aspired to literature, though pronounced writers like Ilse Aichinger and Ernst Jandl were members, as was H. C. Artmann before he got more occupied by the distinctive Wiener Gruppe. (Ingeborg Bachmann however preferred Gruppe 47). Art-Club wanted to be a continuous platform for young painters, sculptors, authors and musicians. Different artist studios were meeting places as well as city cafés. Joint exhibitions could take place in Wiener Secession. The idiom of one group of members reminded critics of Surrealism. Johann Muschik characterized in the late 1950s these particular members Wiener Schule des Phantastischen Realismus (Vienna School of Fantastic Realism). Abstract painting occurred as well, for instance in the works of the young Hundertwasser, but also in a group called Hundsgruppe with among others Arnulf Rainer and Maria Lassnig.

Well-known members

 Friedrich Achleitner
 Ilse Aichinger
 H. C. Artmann
 Konrad Bayer
 Arik Brauer
 Jeannie Ebner
 Paul Flora
 Hans Fronius
 Ernst Fuchs
 Elfriede Gerstl
 Albert Paris Gütersloh
 Rudolf Hausner
 Wolfgang Hollegha
 Friedensreich Hundertwasser
 Wolfgang Hutter
 Ernst Jandl
 Maria Lassnig
 Anton Lehmden
 Friederike Mayröcker
 Josef Mikl
 Ferry Radax
 Arnulf Rainer
 Rudolph von Ripper
 Hans Weigel
 Susanne Wenger

Footnotes

Literature
 Die Wiener Schule des Phantastischen Realismus, exh. cat. (Hannover, Kestner-Ges., 1965)

Culture in Vienna